John Ford House (January 9, 1827 – June 28, 1904) was an American politician and a member of the United States House of Representatives for Tennessee's 6th congressional district.

Biography
House was born on January 9, 1827, near Franklin, Tennessee, in Williamson County. He attended the local academy and the Transylvania University in Lexington, Kentucky. He graduated with a law degree from Cumberland University in 1850, was admitted to the bar, and commenced practice in Franklin, Tennessee.

Career
House moved to Montgomery County, Tennessee, and was a member of the Tennessee House of Representatives in 1853 and a presidential elector on the Constitutional Union ticket of Bell and Everett in 1860. He was a member of the Provisional Congress of the Confederacy from Tennessee. During the American Civil War, he enlisted in the Confederate States Army and served until paroled in Columbus, Mississippi, in June 1865. He was a delegate to the Democratic National Convention in 1868. He was a member of the Tennessee state constitutional convention in 1870.

Elected as a Democrat to the Forty-fourth Congress and the three succeeding Congresses, House served from March 4, 1875, to March 3, 1883.  He was not a candidate for renomination in 1882, and resumed the practice of law.

Death
House died in Clarksville, Tennessee, on June 28, 1904 (age 77 years, 171 days). He is interred at Greenwood Cemetery.

References

External links

1827 births
1904 deaths
Democratic Party members of the Tennessee House of Representatives
People of Tennessee in the American Civil War
Deputies and delegates to the Provisional Congress of the Confederate States
Transylvania University alumni
Tennessee lawyers
Democratic Party members of the United States House of Representatives from Tennessee
19th-century American politicians
Confederate States Army personnel